Alexander "Zander" Robinson (born October 11, 1989) is a professional Canadian football fullback for the Edmonton Eskimos. He was drafted 22nd overall by the Argonauts as a defensive lineman in the 2011 CFL Draft and signed with the team on May 31, 2011. He played CIS football for the Western Ontario Mustangs.

In , Robinson was a member of the 100th Grey Cup champion Argonauts team.

In , Robinson was converted from a defensive lineman to his current fullback position. On August 1, 2013, Robinson scored his first CFL touchdown at home against the B.C. Lions. Robinson finished the 2013 season with 117 receiving yards, on 10 catches, with 2 touchdowns. Following the 2013 season Robinson signed a contract extension which plans to keep him with the Argos through the 2015 CFL season.

References

External links
Toronto Argonauts profile 
 

1989 births
Canadian football defensive linemen
Canadian football fullbacks
Edmonton Elks players
Living people
Players of Canadian football from British Columbia
Canadian football people from Vancouver
Toronto Argonauts players
Western Mustangs football players